Danilia stratmanni is a species of sea snail, a marine gastropod mollusc in the family Chilodontidae.

Description
The size of the shell varies between 8 mm and 13 mm.

Distribution
This marine species occurs off the Philippines.

References

 Poppe G.T., Tagaro S.P. & Dekker H. (2006) The Seguenziidae, Chilodontidae, Trochidae, Calliostomatidae and Solariellidae of the Philippine Islands. Visaya Supplement 2: 1–228. page(s): 32

External links
 

strattmani
Gastropods described in 2006